Tokunbo Afikuyomi  (born 1962) is a Nigerian politician, he who was elected Senator for the Lagos Central constituency at the start of the Nigerian Fourth Republic, running on the Alliance for Democracy (AD) platform. He took office in June 1999.
He changed constituency in April 2002 and ran on the AD platform for the Lagos West constituency instead, after senator Wahab Dosunmu defected to the PDP.
 
Afikuyomi was born in 1962, and obtained a B.Sc degree.
He was a member of the House of Representatives and Special Assistant to the Social Democratic Party (SDP) National Chairman during the aborted Nigerian Third Republic.
After taking his seat in the Senate in June 1999, Afikuyomi was appointed to committees on Aviation, Foreign Affairs, Women Affairs, Public Accounts and Federal Character. Afikuyomi was appointed Commissioner for Tourism in Lagos State by Babatunde Fashola during his first term as governor

In 2017, Senator Afikuyomi was the Chairman, State Election Committee of the All Progressives Congress (APC)

References

Members of the Senate (Nigeria)
Living people
Alliance for Democracy (Nigeria) politicians
Lagos State politicians
Yoruba politicians
Members of the House of Representatives (Nigeria)
Social Democratic Party (Nigeria) politicians
20th-century Nigerian politicians
21st-century Nigerian politicians
Year of birth missing (living people)